Lake Ridge Academy (LRA) is an independent, nonsectarian day school in North Ridgeville, Ohio, United States.

The school was founded in 1963 and offers co-educational classes from kindergarten through grade 12. Lake Ridge Academy is the only independent college preparatory academy on the West Side of Cleveland. The school facilities include 93 acres of open fields, wooded areas, a pond, a creek, tennis courts, track and field track, playing fields.

Lake Ridge Academy is portioned into three divisions: Lower School (K–5), Middle School (6–8), and Upper School (9–12).

School Leadership

Head of School Mitch White joined Lake Ridge Academy in 2018 after previously serving as the Dean of Academic Planning for the Weber School in Atlanta, Georgia.

Campus Facilities

The buildings on the Lake Ridge campus include Lower, Middle, and Upper School buildings, the Bettcher Convocation Center, which houses classrooms, a stage, and an auditorium, the Community Resource Center, a building holding four foreign language classrooms, three computer labs, a video lab, a Kiva gathering place, and a K–12 library. The campus also includes Rob Hall, a hardwood floor gymnasium, a Fine Arts Center with Lower, Middle and Upper School art studios, four acoustical vocal and instrumental music rooms, and a Black Box theater.

Kemper Science and Engineering Building 
In 2016, a new structure named the Kemper Science and Engineering building was constructed and includes a Chemistry lab, a college-level Engineering lab, and a greenhouse. The Kemper building also offers many classes to students. The two main class disciplines taught in the Kemper building are Engineering and Chemistry. The Kemper building also has a fabrication laboratory. The classes that take place in the chemistry laboratory include Chemistry, Honors Chemistry and AP Chemistry. The Kemper Building is also home to the Institute of Scientific Research and Exploration, as well as the Institute for Engineering and Innovation.

Recent events
Lake Ridge annually participates in the Ohio Center for Law-Related Education's Mock Trial competition, and took first place in the state of Ohio in the 2008 competition. The team moved on to the national competition, held in Wilmington, Delaware, and were ranked 13th in the nation. The team regularly places within the top ten within the State of Ohio OCLRE Mock Trial competition.

In the fall of 2009, the Lake Ridge Women's Soccer team won their first ever district title, narrowly defeating Firelands by a score of 1–0.

On October 25, 2008, the Men's Soccer Program won their second consecutive District Championship and earned a spot in the state's regional semifinals. They ended the season with their best record to date, 15–3–2, surpassing the 2007 record of 15–5. Both the 2007 and 2008 regional semifinals games were lost to St. Thomas Aquinas High School

Notable alumni
 Briefly attended by Brian K. Vaughan, comic book writer.
 Claire Sherman, artist

References

External links
 Lake Ridge Academy official website

Educational institutions established in 1963
High schools in Lorain County, Ohio
Private high schools in Ohio
Private middle schools in Ohio
Private elementary schools in Ohio
1963 establishments in Ohio